Joe Drake was a professional American football player who played nose tackle for two seasons for the Philadelphia Eagles and San Francisco 49ers.

References

1963 births
1994 deaths
American football defensive tackles
American football centers
Philadelphia Eagles players
San Francisco 49ers players
Arizona Wildcats football players
National Football League replacement players